The Silver Slugger Award is awarded annually to the best offensive player at each position in both the American League (AL) and the National League (NL), as determined by the coaches and managers of Major League Baseball (MLB). These voters consider several offensive categories in selecting the winners, including batting average, slugging percentage and on-base percentage, in addition to "coaches' and managers' general impressions of a player's overall offensive value." Managers and coaches are not permitted to vote for players on their own team. The Silver Slugger was first awarded in 1980 and is given by Hillerich & Bradsby, the manufacturer of Louisville Slugger bats. The award is a bat-shaped trophy, 3 feet (91 cm) tall, engraved with the names of each of the winners from the league and plated with sterling silver.

Among shortstops, Barry Larkin is the leader in Silver Slugger Awards, with nine wins between 1988 and 1999, including five consecutive awards (1988–1992). Larkin is fourth all-time in Silver Slugger wins among all positions, behind outfielder Barry Bonds, catcher Mike Piazza and third baseman Alex Rodriguez, who won his first seven awards at shortstop before a position change. Hall of Famer Cal Ripken Jr. won eight Silver Sluggers as a shortstop from 1983 to 1993. Derek Jeter won five Silver Sluggers as a shortstop (2006–2009; 2012), while Ian Desmond (2012–2014), Alan Trammell (1987–1988, 1990), Édgar Rentería (2000; 2002–2003) and Xander Bogaerts (2015–2016; 2019) won three.

Rodriguez' offensive statistics in his seven Silver Slugger-winning seasons lead American League and major league shortstops in most categories; his batting average of .358 and .631 slugging percentage in 1996, .420 on-base percentage in 2000 and 57 home runs in 2002 are records among winning shortstops. The lone category in which Rodriguez does not lead the American League is runs batted in (RBI), where Miguel Tejada is the leader; he batted in 150 runs in 2004. The RBI leader in the National League is Trevor Story, who batted in 108 runs in 2018. In contrast, Rodriguez collected RBI totals over 110 (ranging from 111 in 1999 to 142 in 2002) in all of his Silver Slugger-winning seasons, highlighting the difference in power and production between American League and National League shortstops. Other National League leaders include Larkin and Hanley Ramírez, who led in batting average (Larkin and Ramírez batted .342 in 1989 and 2009 respectively) and on-base percentage (Larkin and Ramírez with .410 in 1996 and 2009 respectively), along with Rich Aurilia, who leads in slugging percentage (.572, 2001). Aurilla is also tied with Story as the National League leader in home runs (Aurilla and Story hit 37 in 2001 and 2018 respectively). Though he has never played in the National League, Rodriguez' 40 or more home runs in six of his seven winning seasons at shortstop are greater than any total hit by a National League winner at third base.

Key

American League winners

National League winners

References

Inline citations

External links
Louisville Slugger – The Silver Slugger Award

Silver Slugger Award
Awards established in 1980